Jesse Gray (May 14, 1923 – January 2, 1988) was an American civil rights leader and politician from New York.

Biography
Jesse Gray was born on May 14, 1923, near Baton Rouge, Louisiana. He came to New York City and was a tailor and a member of the National Maritime Union in the 1940s.

He organized protests of tenants against conditions in Harlem's slum areas in the 1950s. In November 1963, he led a widespread rent strike. To emphasize bad conditions and infestation with vermin, the tenants caught rats in their tenements and showed them to the judge of the New York City Civil Court. No measures were taken to better the conditions, and the protesters rioted the next year.

He became head of the Community Council for Housing, and organized the National Tenants Organization. He also entered politics as a Democrat. In 1969, he ran unsuccessfully for the New York City Council. In 1970, he challenged Congressman Adam Clayton Powell Jr., but was defeated. Gray was elected to the New York State Assembly (70th D.) in November 1972, and was a member in 1973 and 1974. In 1974, he ran for re-nomination, but was defeated in the Democratic primary.

He died on January 2, 1988, at the Beth Abraham Home in the Bronx, after lying in a coma for several years.

References

1923 births
1988 deaths
People from Harlem
African-American state legislators in New York (state)
Democratic Party members of the New York State Assembly
People from Baton Rouge, Louisiana
20th-century American politicians
Politicians from New York City
20th-century African-American politicians
African-American men in politics